The 2001–02 Euroleague Women was the sixth edition of the Euroleague era of FIBA's premier international competition for European women's basketball clubs, running between 31 October 2001 and 28 April 2002. Last year's runner-up US Valenciennes Olympic defeated Lotos Gdynia in the final to become the second French club to win the competition.

Group stage

Group A

Group B

Quarter-finals

Final four
 Gdynia, Poland

References

EuroLeague Women seasons